FC Chayka-VMS Sevastopol was a Ukrainian football club based in Sevastopol. In 2001–02, the club took part in the Ukrainian Second League for the last time.

The club's colours where white and blue.

History
Previous names:
 1964–1965: Chaika Balaklava
 1966–1970: Chaika Sevastopol
 1971–1974: Avanhard Sevastopol
 1975: Khvylya Sevastopol
 1976–1986: Atlantyka Sevastopol
 1987–1996: Chaika Sevastopol
 1997–2000: Chornomorets Sevastopol
 2001–2002: Chaika-VMS Sevastopol

In 1964 the club presented the city and as Chayka Balaklava again competed in Soviet Second League. In 1966, after the merger Balaklava to Sevastopol has changed its name to Chayka Sevastopol. In 1967 the club finished in fourth place high in their area, but the following season did not join the professional tournament.

It was only in 1971 under the name Avanhard Sevastopol competed in the Second League, Zone 1 The club also called Khvylya Sevastopol and Atlantyka Sevastopol in 1987 to return to the old name Chayka Sevastopol.

In 1990–1991, after yet another reorganization of the Soviet Union league club played in the Soviet Second Lower League, Zone 1.

Ukraine's first championship in 1992, the club began in the Ukrainian First League, the first subgroup. Club took the penultimate 13th place and were relegated to the Ukrainian Second League. In the 1995–96 season, he ranked 12th in their group, but the financial problems did not join the tournament next season.

In 1997, the club has already called Chornomorets Sevastopol as a participant in Ukraine's final tournament of amateur teams qualified for the Second League Group B. In the 1999–2000 season, took 11th place in their group, but again by the financial problems did not join the tournament in the next season.

In 2001, already as Chayka-VMS Sevastopol (VMS – abbreviation for Navy (Military Marine Forces)) has been reported for the third time the tournament in the Second League. He finished last in 18th place in its group and was deprived of a professional status.

The club disbanded in 2002, founded a new club PFC Sevastopol who continued the tradition of football.

Coaches
 Yuriy Lis (1971)
 Viktor Fomin (1973–1974)
 Anatoliy Zayayev (1981–1982)
 Valentin Tugarin (1983–1986)
 Hennadiy Makarov (1987–1990)
 A. Pavlyukov (1991)
/ Oleksiy Rudyka (1991–1992)
 Vasyl Borys (1992–1993)
 Hennadiy Makarov (1993–1994)
 Oleh Zhylin (1994–1995)
 Valeriy Petrov (1995–1996)
 Vasyl Borys (1997–1999)
 Valeriy Petrov (1999)
 Serhiy Diyev (2000) (caretaker)
 Yevhen Repenkov (2001–2002)

League and cup history

Soviet Union
Sources:

Ukraine
Sources:

References

External links
 Statistics

 
Defunct football clubs in Sevastopol
Association football clubs established in 1964
Association football clubs disestablished in 2002
1964 establishments in the Soviet Union
2002 disestablishments in Ukraine